Matthieu Andre Jean Marc Luc Descoteaux (born September 23, 1977) is a Canadian former professional ice hockey defenceman who played in the National Hockey League (NHL) with the Montreal Canadiens.

Playing career
As a youth, Descoteaux played in the 1991 Quebec International Pee-Wee Hockey Tournament with a minor ice hockey team from Francheville, Quebec.

Descoteaux was selected in the first round of the 1996 NHL Entry Draft, 19th overall, by the Edmonton Oilers. On March 9, 2000 he was traded from Edmonton to Montreal with Christian Laflamme in exchange for Igor Ulanov and Alain Nasreddine. He played five games in the National Hockey League  with the Montreal Canadiens. 

He spent the majority of his career in the American Hockey League, and also played in Finland, Italy and Germany.  He last played in the Ligue Nord-Americaine de Hockey for Sainte-Marie Poutrelles Delta.

Career statistics

Awards and honours

References

External links

1977 births
Asiago Hockey 1935 players
Canadian ice hockey defencemen
Edmonton Oilers draft picks
French Quebecers
EHC Freiburg players
Hamilton Bulldogs (AHL) players
Hull Olympiques players
Ice hockey people from Quebec
Kansas City Outlaws players
Living people
Montreal Canadiens players
National Hockey League first-round draft picks
People from Centre-du-Québec
Quebec Citadelles players
Quebec RadioX players
Shawinigan Cataractes players
Tappara players
Utah Grizzlies (AHL) players
Vaasan Sport players
Canadian expatriate ice hockey players in Finland